A member state is a state that is a member of an international organization or of a federation or confederation.

Since the World Trade Organization (WTO) and the International Monetary Fund (IMF) include some members that are not sovereign states, neither organization ever speaks of "member states". The WTO has simply "members" (see WTO members), and the IMF refers to its members as "member countries".

The oldest global member state based organization is the International Telecommunication Union, which joined the United Nations System as a Specialized Agency of the T1088 after the creation of the UN.

Worldwide 
 Member states of the United Nations | 193
Member states of the International Telecommunication Union | 193
 Member states of UNESCO | 195
 Interpol#Members | 190
 Member states of the World Intellectual Property Organization | 184
 Member states of the World Sports Alliance | 24
 Member states of the League of Nations
 Member states of the Venice Commission | 58
 Member states of the World Customs Organization | 173 sovereign states, 4 customs territories and one customs union
 International Hydrographic Organization#Member countries
 International Centre for the Study of the Preservation and Restoration of Cultural Property#Member states
 Alliance of Small Island States#Member states | 39
 Intersputnik#Member states
 World Health Organization | 194

Worldwide - language related 
 Member states of the Arab League | 22
 Member states of the Dutch Language Union | 3
 Member states of the Commonwealth of Nations | 56
 Member states of the Latin Union | 36
 Member states of the Community of Portuguese Language Countries | 8
 Member states of the International Organization of the Francophonie
 Member states of the Organization of Ibero-American States | 24

Worldwide - religion related 
 Member states of the Organisation of Islamic Cooperation | 57

Worldwide - commodity related 
 Member states of the International Atomic Energy Agency | 167
 Member states of OPEC | 12
 Member states of CIP | 14
 Member states of the Organisation for the Prohibition of Chemical Weapons | 195+

Restricted to a continent or larger region

Other
 Member states of the Commonwealth of Independent States | 9 + 2 unofficial participants (Turkmenistan and Ukraine)

Military 
 Member states of NATO | 30
In history:
 Warsaw Pact#Members
 Central Powers#Member states

References

See also
 Continental union
Federated state
 State (country subdivision)